Beach soccer at the 2010 Asian Beach Games was held from 8 December to 16 December 2010 in Muscat, Oman.

Medalists

Results

First round

Group A

Group B

Group C

Group D

Knockout round

Quarterfinals

Semifinals

Bronze medal match

Gold medal match

Goalscorers

9 goals

 
 
 
 

8 goals

 

6 goals

 
 
 
 
 
 

5 goals

 
 
 
 
 
 
 
 
 
 
 

4 goals

 
 
 
 
 
 
 
 
 

3 goals

 
 
 
 
 

2 goals

 
 
 
 
 
 
 
 
 
 
 
 
 
 
 
 
 
 

1 goal

 
 
 
 
 
 
 
 
 
 
 
 
 
 
 
 
 
 
 
 
 
 
 
 
 
 
 
 
 
 
 

 Own goals





References
 Official site

2010 Asian Beach Games events
Beach
2010
2010
2010 in beach soccer